A ghost station  is a disused train station through which revenue-service passenger trains (especially rapid transit trains) pass but at which they do not stop. The term is also sometimes used for any unused underground station or any unused station, whether or not trains pass through them. In Germany, a station that has been built in the course of constructing something else as a so-called "Bauvorleistung" (roughly: construction pre-effort) is referred to as a "ghost station", despite the different purpose and origin of the terms. Some English-language publications also refer to "pre-built" stations or parts thereof that have yet to see service as "ghost stations".

Etymology
The term "ghost station" is a calque of the German word  (plural ). The German term was coined to describe certain stations on Berlin's  and  metro networks that  were closed during the period of Berlin's division during the Cold War because they were an integral part of a transit line mostly located on the other side of the Berlin Wall.

Ghost stations in Berlin

Background

In August 1961 the East German government built the Berlin Wall, ending freedom of movement between East and West Berlin. As a result, the Berlin public transit network, which had formerly spanned both halves of the city, was also divided into two. Some  and  lines fell entirely into one half of the city or the other; other lines were divided between the two jurisdictions, with trains running only to the border and then turning back. However, there were three lines—the  lines now designated U6 and U8, and the  Tunnel on the —that ran for the most part through West Berlin but passed for a short distance through the borough of Mitte (the historic city centre), which was East Berlin territory. These lines continued to be open to West Berliners; however, trains did not stop at most of the stations located within East Berlin, though for technical reasons they did have to slow down significantly while passing through. The name  was soon aptly applied to these dimly lit, heavily guarded stations by travellers from West Berlin, who watched them pass by through the carriage windows. However, the term was never official; West Berlin  maps of the period simply labelled these stations "" ("stations at which the trains do not stop").

The situation was less than ideal. The lines were a vital part of the West Berlin transit network, but because part of the route of some of the lines lay in East Berlin territory, it was difficult for Western support staff to perform maintenance work on the tracks and tunnels. If a train on a West Berlin line broke down in East Berlin territory, then passengers had to wait for Eastern border police to appear and escort them out. The East German government occasionally hinted that it might someday block access to the tunnels at the border and run its own service on the East Berlin sections of these lines. However, this awkward status quo persisted for the entire 28-year period of the division of Berlin.

At the closed stations, barbed wire fences were installed to prevent any would-be escapees from East Berlin from accessing the track bed, and the electrically live third rail served as an additional and potentially lethal deterrent. An alarm was triggered if anyone breached one of the barriers. As for the entrances, the signage was removed, walkways were walled up and stairways were sealed with concrete slabs. Police stations were built into the windowed platform service booths, from which the whole platform area could be monitored.

A wide white line on the wall marked the exact location of the border. Later, gates were installed at some stations that could be rolled into place at night while the guards were off-duty. Guard posts at other stations were staffed continuously, creating additional employment positions with the transport police. In the platform area, the guards always worked in pairs, and care was taken in their assignment to assure that there would be no personal ties between them. In addition, superior officers could conduct surprise inspections at any time, thus, maintaining maximum security. Other stations were secured by the East German border guards.

Particular stations
Instead, it served as a transfer point between U6 and several  lines. Western passengers could walk from one platform to another without ever leaving the station or having to show papers, much like air travellers changing planes at an international airport. Westerners with appropriate visas could also enter East Berlin there (they could even get a visa in the station). There was an Intershop in the station that could be accessed without having to pass a border or customs checkpoint of either East or West Germany and it was thus a popular place for westerners to buy cheap alcohol in D-Mark, but the West Berlin customs considered goods bought there contraband and did spot checks on what they considered customs evasion.

The  station was the only ghost station not located in a tunnel. It was situated close to the wall near the  border crossing. West Berlin trains passed through it without stopping. East Berlin  trains passed the same station but on different tracks. The tracks used by Western and Eastern trains were sealed off from each other by a tall fence.

Another oddity was  station. Like , it was an  stop served by West Berlin trains, but located on East Berlin territory just behind the border. However,  was in use and accessible for West Berliners, as one of its exits opened on a West Berlin street. This exit was exactly on the border line, a warning sign next to it informing passengers about the situation. Its other exits to East Berlin streets were blocked.

Reopening

The first people to enter the ghost stations after the fall of the Berlin Wall in November 1989 found that they lived up to their informal name, with ads and signage on the walls unchanged since 1961. None of them have been preserved.

Hand-drawn destination signs were hung up covering the old ones from pre-1961; these signs were both crumbling from age and obviously missing the termini of post-1961 line extensions. On 22 December 1989,  (U8) was reopened with a similar provisional checkpoint.

As its northern exit was directly on the border, it could be opened with direct access to West Berlin without the need of a checkpoint. Its southern exit towards East Berlin was not reopened until 1 July 1990.

Discussions on reopening all the U6 and U8 stations including the S-Bahn station ,  and  had begun on 13 April 1990 without border controls. These took two months to clean up, removing all the dirt and refurbishing the interiors; all stations had been reopened on 1 July 1990 at 11 a.m., as East Berlin and East Germany had adopted the West German currency (DM), leaving the border checkpoints abandoned.

On 12 December 1990,  was reopened for West Berlin trains; a second platform for East Berlin trains allowing interchange followed on 5 August 1991.

The  system reached a preliminary completion in 2002 (with the reopening of the ring), even though there are still disused sections of lines closed in the aftermath of the wall. Decisions on reopening of some of these sections are still to be made. There was a political promise made in the course of reunification that all S-Bahn lines and services shut down due to partition were to be restored - with federal funds if need be - but as of 2021 this is still not the case and some former services are seen to be as of lower importance than proposed entirely new construction.

List of all Berlin ghost stations
This list only includes those stations in East Berlin territory that western trains passed through without stopping. There were other stations on both sides of the wall that were closed during the division because those sections of track were not in use.

Temporary checkpoints were set up for stations with access to East Berlin that were reopened before 1 July 1990. Checkpoints were no longer necessary for those reopened after that date when border checks were eliminated with the currency union between East and West Germany.

New ghost stations after reunification
In contrast with the above-listed stations, multiple stations in the Berlin area that were of high importance during the Cold War rapidly lost importance and passengers after reunification, some to the point of becoming ghost stations. The most notable examples are:

  : station on the Berlin Outer Ring located due south of Berlin, quite far from any populated place, lost its importance with the resumption of direct routes from the Potsdam area to East Berlin and due to the reduction of the workforce in the  factory located nearby. Trains running between Potsdam and the  station stopped at the station until December 2012. A train stop named  was built 2 km to the west (closer to populated areas) and brought into service with the closure of the  station.
 : an interchange station also located on the Berlin Outer Ring on the outskirts of Potsdam, named  (Potsdam Main station) between 1961 and 1993, was the most important station of Potsdam when the traffic flow to West Berlin (Berlin–Magdeburg railway) was severely restricted. After resumption of service between Potsdam and  station, the  station lost its importance, became unstaffed in 1994. Although its present-day importance is negligible and its decaying appearance is not unlike "real" ghost stations from the Cold War era, it still has regular passenger trains stopping at it.
 Due to the delays in opening Berlin Brandenburg Airport the train station serving it (which was ready for use on the originally planned opening date in 2012) was served by empty trains to prevent mold.
Französische Straße (Berlin U-Bahn) mentioned above shut down permanently in December 2020 when the new interchange station with the extended U5 opened as the two are too close to each other. It is thus the only Berlin U-Bahn station to be a ghost station twice over and for entirely different reasons.

Ghost stations elsewhere

Argentina

The  Underground has four ghost stations. The two stations on Line A were originally two single-platform stations closed in 1953 since their close proximity meant trains had to stop in quick succession and frequencies were reduced. The stations are preserved to maintain their original appearance and can still be seen when travelling on the line, even being used as a display for a time.

They have both been used as maintenance areas for Line E and Line C, while one of the stations served as a set for the 1996 Argentine film . The stations were under consideration to be re-purposed as part of the new Line F, however it was later decided to build new tunnels instead.

There are also two stations ( and ) on Line E and Line D which were designed to be used as temporary stations while their respective lines were being extended. Though the platforms remain, they cannot be considered true ghost stations since they were never intended to be a permanent part of the network and designed to be re-purposed as electrical substations once the permanent stations were built.

 Underground Line A
 
 
 Underground Line E

Australia
 General Motors on the Gippsland railway line. (Not an underground station, nor part of an underground network).
 Nyanda on the Gold Coast railway line. (Not an underground station, nor part of an underground network).
Woollahra on the Eastern Suburbs railway line. (Not an underground station, partially constructed but never opened).

Austria
 Vienna Underground Railway: Station  of line U2 closed in 2003 and the old  station.

Belgium
 Charleroi Premetro is notable for several stations and lines built but never opened

Brazil
  (São Paulo Metro), platforms of the Moema branch, never opened
  (São Paulo Metro), underground docks that would serve the Southeast-Southwest line, but which would not have been put into service
 Pirelli Station (CPTM São Paulo) in Santo André
 Paranapiacaba Station (CPTM São Paulo) in Paranapiacaba in Santo André

Bulgaria
 St. Naum Station and NDK Station of the Sofia Metro. Both stations were built in the 1980s, together with the National Palace of Culture and the redevelopment of the surrounding area. Currently these stations are fully completed and had become operational on 31 August 2012. St. Naum Station is operating under the name of European Union Metro Station.
  Station.

Canada

 Lower Bay in Toronto. Below the main platform for Bay station is an abandoned level which was used for only six months in 1966 when the Toronto Transit Commission (TTC) experimentally interlined portions of both the Yonge–University and Bloor–Danforth lines. This abandoned platform is sometimes referred to as "Lower Bay"  by the general public or "Bay Lower" by the TTC.
 Municipal Building in Calgary. A downtown subway was originally planned under 8th Avenue for the Calgary C-Train. In preparation, a short section of tunnel and underground LRT station were built under the Calgary Municipal Building when it was constructed in 1985. Subway plans were halted because the initial surface line on 7th Avenue turned out to have much more passenger capacity than expected. The underground station and downtown subway may be completed in the foreseeable future as future C-Train lines which are under construction and proposed will exceed the capacity of the 7th Avenue surface line.
 Edmonton Light Rail Transit. An underground LRT station was built between Stadium and Churchill stations as a proposed future light rail station. There is concrete poured to form two elevator shafts and part of the platform. There are concrete walls that block stairs that go to the Edmonton Remand Centre and to the Edmonton Law Courts.

Chile
 Echeverría is a ghost station located in Line 4A, also closed because of the low density of people traveling around and through it.
 The original project of the line 3 side of Puente Cal y Canto metro station is also a ghost station. The entire line 3 was canceled because of the 1985 Algarrobo earthquake.

China
Beijing Subway restricted stations

Czech Republic
  and  stations on Line B of Prague Metro were ghost stations from 1998 to 1999 (2001 for ). The stations were in a state of suspended construction as the heavy industry factories they should have served were closed after the Velvet Revolution. Trains slowed down when passing through these dimly lit stations. As the whole industrial area was slowly revitalized the stations were finally completed.
  station was closed from July 2012 to June 2014 due to construction of a new shopping and business centre. Trains passed through the station without stopping.

Denmark
The station was closed in 2007 when the  station ("New  station") was built when  (line F) was extended, with connections between these two lines.

Finland
The Kamppi metro station has an unused north–south station, below and at right angles to the east–west one currently in use. Excavated at the same time as the east–west station, it was never outfitted, because the corresponding north–south metro line was never built. 
The Hakaniemi metro station has another similar ghost station, built for the U-line which was eventually not constructed, and its excavation remains incomplete. They have no trains and are not accessible. 
The University of Helsinki metro station is a former ghost station, since it was excavated in the late 1970s, but opened to the public in 1995. 
Under Munkkivuori Shopping Centre in Helsinki is an unfinished space for Helsinki Metro station. The space was reserved during expansion work of the shopping centre in early 60s but never used.

France

Germany
Apart from Berlin (which also has provisions for future extensions that serve no current purpose):

  Light Railway: station , built, but never opened
  Rapid Transit: station  closed since 1990 and Station  at  Airport since 1998
  Underground Railway: station , built, but never opened; station  on line U2 and station 
 Hanover Light Railway: part of station , built, but never opened
 Cologne Light Railway: station  closed in 2003, built, but never opened
 Munich Rapid Transit: München Olympiastadion station closed in 1988
 Nuremberg Ring Railway: stations  and  closed in 1992; the former station "Märzfeld" served the Nazi party rallying grounds and later deportations to the Nazi death camps. It can be visited in guided tours.
 Nuremberg U-Bahn: minor provisions made for a future infill station between Flughafen station and Ziegelstein station; there is an emergency exit near the proposed site of this tentative "Marienberg station"

On some German high speed lines there are provisions made at overtaking stations (which serve an important function for operating trains, but do not appear obvious to most passengers as having any purpose) to allow for (conversion to) passenger service more easily in the future. In some cases this is as little as leaving more space between tracks to allow for the future construction of platforms, while in others there are significant parts of a passenger station constructed before the decision to not serve it after all is made. An example that has attracted particular public debate regarding the feasibility and desirability of passenger service is Ilmenau-Wolfsberg service station in a forest near Ilmenau along the Nuremberg–Erfurt high-speed railway.

Hong Kong 

 Rumsey station in the MTR. This platform was originally reserved for the East Kowloon line proposal in the 1970s, in order to minimise the effects on the Island line. The station is now called  and formerly served as the terminus of the Island line before the opening of West Island line. Since the platforms were built as the upper platforms, passengers going to and from exit E must pass through the abandoned platforms. In preparation for the opening of the West Island line extension the station was renovated, and the track area along the platforms was walled off.

Indonesia 
Indonesia has some ghost stations like Gunung Putri railway station and Pondok Rajeg railway station.

Ireland

A "ghost station" exists on the Luas tram system in Dublin, on the Green Line between Ballyogan Wood and Carrickmines. It was intended to service new suburbs, but the post-2008 Irish economic downturn meant that the suburbs were never built and the tram passes through empty fields at that point on the line. The station is labelled "Future Stop" on the route map; it will be called "Brennanstown" if and when it opens.

Israel
Rosh HaAyin South railway station became a ghost station on Israel Railways network in 2003, when the line it served as a terminus was extended towards Kfar Saba–Nordau railway station, and a new station, serving Rosh HaAyin was built a couple of kilometers to the north.

Italy 
Italy does not have a long list of ghost stations. Amongst the few examples is Quintiliani, on Line B of the Rome Metro. It was built in 1990 as part of the extension towards the northeast of Line B, but was kept unused because it was meant to serve a planned business district called Sistema Direzionale Orientale (Eastern Directional District) that was never realized.

In the early 2000s the project of the S.D.O. was cancelled and the station, which was in the middle of nowhere, was taken in charge by the Municipality of Rome and renewed to make it compliant with the new security rules issued in the meantime; a new bus line was established to link the station to the nearby Sandro Pertini general hospital. On 23 June 2003 it was officially opened to passenger traffic, ending a 13-year long period of ghost station status.

Japan
  station on the  Main Line (closed in 2004)
  station on the   Line (closed in 2004)
  station on the Tokyo Metro  Line (closed in 1931)
There are two "ghost stations" in the Seikan tunnel (Tappi-Kaitei Station & Yoshioka-Kaitei Station) which lost all remaining passenger service in the course of the construction of the Hokkaido Shinkansen.

Malaysia

Partially completed during construction between 1994 and 1999 but remaining inactive and mothballed for a decade after the opening of the line, as ridership via the station was initially projected to be too low. Completed and opened in December 2010 following new property developments around the station.

New Zealand

 Helensville railway station on Auckland's Northern Line closed in 2009 
  railway station on Auckland's Northern Line, a temporary stop in 2008 and 2009 
  railway station on Auckland's Northern Line closed in 2009
  railway station with electrification terminating at Swanson, this station has closed (2014)

North Korea

Norway

  on the Oslo Metro
  on the Oslo Metro
  in the Oslo Tunnel

All three are real ghost stations, underground stations with trains passing through.

Portugal 

 Reboleira: The station started to be constructed, but never ended due to the 2010–14 Portuguese financial crisis. In June 2015, the  company announced that the construction of the station and of the connecting line would be resumed, and that the station would be operational. This metro station opened in 13 April 2016.
Arroios: This station was closed for renovations in late 2017, and was originally expected to reopen in late 2019; however, the renovations of that station have been delayed.

Russia

Moscow Metro
After the lines they were serving were extended and proper stations built, these were closed.

Saint Petersburg Metro
 , a bay platform opened in 1966, closed in 1977, a part of the platform was rebuilt as a police building.

Nizhny Novgorod Metro
 , located between the Moskovskaya and Strelka stations. Its construction was started in 1993, but was discontinued in 1996. At first, in this station there was a headshunt for trains. After the opening of the Strelka station you can see the branch and expansion of the tunnel for the station. Presumably this station will be completed after 2020.

Singapore 

 Bukit Brown is an unopened station along the Circle line. It is currently only a shell station with a ventilation shaft. It is located on top of Bukit Brown Chinese Cemetery and Jalan Mashor, an almost totally abandoned road. Hume station is also a ventilation shaft, and will be opened as a station in 2025
 Currently, Mount Pleasant and Marina South are also ghost stations, to be opened in tandem with housing estates in the area.
 Several stations on the Punggol LRT, including the entire West Loop, did not open with the rest of the line in 2005. Nearly all of these stations have since opened for service alongside developments in their respective areas. As of 2017, only one station, Teck Lee, remains closed, as it is currently surrounded by jungle.
 There is a reserved space for a new station on the North East line between HarbourFront and Outram Park but there is no station box there. Two other stations were constructed on the line but did not open with the rest of the line in 2003; these were Buangkok and Woodleigh, which subsequently opened in 2006 and 2011, respectively.
 Ten Mile Junction station on the Bukit Panjang LRT opened in November 1999, and was permanently closed on 13 January 2019, to facilitate upgrading works for the line. The station was previously closed from late 2010 to early 2012 for refurbishment works.

South Korea
 A second platform for Seoul Subway Line 2 at Sinseol-dong station

Spain

 Disused Barcelona Metro stations
 Chamberí on Line 1 of Madrid Metro - one of the first stations to open, it was closed after train and platform lengths increased to such a degree that the distance from it to the neighboring stations was deemed too short. It is now a museum.
 Mercat Central on Line 10 of Metrovalencia was the only completed station on the section planned, but later abandoned, from Alacant to Tavernes Blanques.

Sweden
  on the Stockholm Metro (trains pass through it)
  in Gothenburg (prepared underground station not used by trains)

Ukraine
  in the Kryvyi Rih Metrotram

United Kingdom
 List of former and unopened London Underground stations
 Merkland Street on the Glasgow Subway.
 King's Cross Thameslink

United States

 Euclid–East 120th on the RTA Rapid Transit in Cleveland
 Nine stations on the New York City Subway, as well as two stations on the PATH system
 Woodhaven Junction on the Atlantic Branch of the LIRR
 Franklin Square on the PATCO Speedline and Spring Garden on the Broad-Ridge Spur in Philadelphia
 Six stations on the Chicago "L"
 Three stations on the VTA light rail system in San Jose, as well as Eureka Valley in San Francisco
 The unused east–west platform at Government Center Station on the Metrorail in Miami
 Harvard-Holyoke near Boston
 The former platforms of the Gateway station in Pittsburgh
 The former platforms of the Little Tokyo/Arts District station in Los Angeles
 29th & Welton in Denver
 Subway Terminal Building in Los Angeles contains an abandoned station in the basement with its terminus at Belmont Tunnel/Toluca Substation and Yard. The tunnel was bisected by new construction in the early 21st century.

See also
 Abandoned railway station

References

External links
 Except from a documentary on the ghost stations
 

Berlin S-Bahn
Berlin U-Bahn
Cold War history of Germany
Berlin Wall